John Michael Coker (born October 28, 1971) is an American professional basketball player born in Richland, Washington.

Playing at center at 7'0", he has played in the NBA for three teams and also in the Continental Basketball Association with the Idaho Stampede. He has also been under contract with, but has not played in any regular season games for the Toronto Raptors (1997), Houston Rockets (1999) and Minnesota Timberwolves (2000).

External links
NBA stats @ basketballreference.com
NBDL stats @ basketballreference.com

1971 births
Living people
American expatriate basketball people in Croatia
American expatriate basketball people in Italy
American expatriate basketball people in Spain
American men's basketball players
Asheville Altitude players
Basketball players from Washington (state)
Boise State Broncos men's basketball players
Centers (basketball)
Club Ourense Baloncesto players
Connecticut Pride players
Golden State Warriors players
Idaho Stampede (CBA) players
Liga ACB players
People from Richland, Washington
Phoenix Suns players
Quad City Thunder players
Sioux Falls Skyforce (CBA) players
Undrafted National Basketball Association players
Viola Reggio Calabria players
Washington Wizards players